William Martel (fl. 1130–1153) was a steward of the royal households of King Henry I and King Stephen of England. He was castellan of Sherborne Castle until 1143.

William Martel was of Norman descent. His grandfather and his uncle were sheriffs of Dorset in Norman England. Martel was a steward of King Henry I's royal household from at least 1130. He attested to charters in both England and Normandy which indicates that Martel regularly accompanied the king on both sides of the English Channel.

Martel was in Normandy with Henry's royal court throughout 1134 and 1135. After Henry's death, he was present at King Stephen's coronation in London on 22 December 1135.

Martel was one of Stephen's most dependable supporters throughout the civil war of 1136–1153, known as The Anarchy. He witnessed 181 charters for Stephen, demonstrating his frequent attendance in the king's entourage, although he received neither an earldom nor any significant estates from Stephen. He was, however, castellan of Sherborne Castle from at least 1141, and may have been castellan from as early as 1139 when the castle was surrendered to King Stephen. Between 1141 and 1143, Martel was Stephen's regional military governor in north Dorset and Wiltshire, exercising authority on the king's behalf from Sherborne.

Martel continued to be active on Stephen's behalf after the king was captured at the Battle of Lincoln on 2 February 1141. At the council of Winchester, 7–9 April 1141, Martel was one of a delegation of Stephen's supporters that petitioned for the king's release from prison. The delegation was dismissed and Martel was excommunicated by the Bishop of Winchester.

At the Battle of Wilton on 1 July 1143, when King Stephen's forces were dispersed by those of Robert Earl of Gloucester, William Martel led a determined rearguard action that allowed the king to escape. Martel was eventually surrounded and captured, and to secure his release King Stephen surrendered Sherborne Castle to Robert of Gloucester.

After the loss of Sherborne Castle, Martel continued to be a dominant character at King Stephen's court.

In 1147, the abbot of Abingdon sought ecclesiastical sanctions against Martel for attacks that he carried out against the monastery's estates.

In 1150, a joint meeting of the county courts of Norfolk and Suffolk, at Norwich, was presided over by William Martel as king's justice.

In August 1153, William Martel and other supporters of King Stephen laid waste to the area around Wallingford Castle in an attempt to isolate the army of Henry Plantagenet, who was challenging the king for the throne. Martel's forces were ambushed and routed by Henry's army as it attempted to break out from the blockade.

In November 1153 William Martel was one of the 37 witnesses to the Treaty of Westminster which concluded the war between King Stephen and Henry Plantagenet and laid the conditions for Henry's succession.

At Henry's first exchequer, William rendered account for Surrey for 1154-5 but possibly not very well, for he then lost his position as sheriff.

Notes

References

Bibliography
Amt, E. (1993). The Accession of Henry II in England. Royal Government Restored. Woodbridge: The Boydell Press.  
Bartlett, R. (2000). England Under the Norman and Angevin Kings 1075–1225. Oxford: Oxford University Press. 
Crouch, D. (2000). The Reign of King Stephen 1135–1154. Harlow, Essex: Longman. 
Davis, R.H.C. (1990).King Stephen, Third Edition. London and New York: Longman. 
Hollister, C.W. (2003). Henry I, Paperback Edition. New Haven and London: Yale University Press. 
King, E. (2010).  King Stephen. New Haven and London:  Yale University Press.  (pbk)
Matthew, D. (2002). King Stephen. London and New York: Hambledon and London. 
Poole, A.L. (1955). Domesday Book to Magna Carta 1087–1216, Second Edition. Oxford University Press. 

Anglo-Normans
Norman warriors
People excommunicated by the Catholic Church
People of The Anarchy